The Sant Joan Funicular is a funicular railway at Montserrat, near Barcelona in Catalonia, Spain. The line connects the monastery, and the upper terminus of the Montserrat Rack Railway, with sacred sites, walking trails and viewpoints higher up the mountain. With a maximum gradient of 65 %, it is the steepest funicular in Spain.

Overview 
The funicular has the following technical parameters:

Technical Parameters 
Length: 
Height: 
Maximum steepness: 65.2 %
Cars: 2
Capacity: 60 passengers per car
Configuration: Single track with passing loop
Travel time: 6 minutes
Track gauge: 
Traction: Electrical

Operation 
The line is operated by the Ferrocarrils de la Generalitat de Catalunya (Catalan Government Railways, FGC), who also operate the Montserrat Rack Railway and the Funicular de la Santa Cova funicular railway on Montserrat Mountain, together with two other funicular railways and a significant suburban railway system in and around Barcelona.

History 
The line was originally built in 1918, and modified to increase capacity in 1926. In 1986 it passed to the FGC, who modernised it in 1997, providing new panoramic cars with transparent roofs.

Between November 2017 and March 2018, the line was closed for maintenance on the winding gear.

References

External links 

Official website of the Montserrat Rack Railway and associated funicular railways (in Catalan, Spanish, English and French)
Photographic description and map of the line from Trens de Catalunya (in Catalan)

Funicular railways in Catalonia
Metre gauge railways in Spain
Transport in Bages